The  was a B'B' wheel arrangement diesel-hydraulic locomotive type operated in Japan as a self-propelled rotary snowplough unit from 1961 to 2015 by the national railway company Japanese National Railways (JNR), and later by East Japan Railway Company (JR East). West Japan Railway Company (JR West), and Hokkaido Railway Company (JR Hokkaido).

Design
Based on the earlier Class DD13 6th-batch locomotives, the Class DD14 was a single-end-cab design with a rotary snowplough unit at the cab end. It was the first diesel-powered rotary snowplough built by JNR. The locomotives had two  diesel engines. One engine could be used for propulsion with the other driving the rotary snowplough unit, giving a snow-clearing capacity of approximately 3,000 tonnes per hour, or the unit could be operated in multiple with a second locomotive allowing both engines to drive the rotary snowplough, giving a snow-clearing capacity of approximately 4,000 tonnes per hour.

Variants
 DD14-0: 8 locomotives built between 1961 and 1965 by Kisha Seizō
 DD14-300: 35 locomotives built between 1966 and 1979 by Kisha Seizō and Kawasaki Heavy Industries

History
By 2005, only nine locomotives remained in service, all operated by JR East. The last remaining locomotives in service, DD14 327 and 332, based at JR East's Nagaoka Depot, made their final run on 24 February 2014.

Fleet list

Preserved examples
, three Class DD14 locomotives are preserved in Japan, with one locomotive sold to Taiwan High Speed Rail (THSR) in Taiwan.
 DD14 1: Preserved at the Mikasa Railway Museum in Mikasa, Hokkaido
 DD14 312: Preserved privately in Kitami, Hokkaido
 DD14 323: Preserved at the Otaru Museum in Otaru, Hokkaido
 DD14 331: Owned by THSR in Taiwan

Related classes
 Class DD15 snowplough propulsion unit
 Class DD16 snowplough propulsion unit
 Class DD18 snowplough propulsion unit
 Class DD19 snowplough propulsion unit
 Class DD53 snowplough propulsion unit
 Class DE15 snowplough propulsion unit

Classification

The DD14 classification for this locomotive type is explained below.
 D: Diesel locomotive
 D: Four driving axles
 14: Locomotive with maximum speed of 85 km/h or less

References

Diesel locomotives of Japan
DD14
DD14
DD14
Kawasaki diesel locomotives
1067 mm gauge locomotives of Japan
B-B locomotives
Railway locomotives introduced in 1961
Snow removal